Goc or GOC may refer to:

People 
 Marcel Goc (born 1983), German ice hockey player
 Nikolai Goc (born 1986), German ice hockey player
 Sascha Goc (born 1979), German ice hockey player

Other uses 
 Goč, a mountain in Serbia
 Gene Ontology Consortium, the groups involved in the Gene Ontology project
 General officer commanding
 General Optical Council, a British medical regulator
 Global Occult Coalition, a fictional assembly of the United Nations dedicated to the paranormal from the SCP Foundation.
 Government of Canada
 Government-owned corporation
 Greek Orthodox Church
 Ground Observer Corps, an American World War II and Cold War Civil Defense organization
 Guardians of the Cedars, a former Lebanese militia
 Golden Rock railway station, in Golden Rock, Tiruchirappalli, India